This article details the Hull FC's rugby league football club's 2020 season.

Fixtures and results 
  

All fixtures are subject to change

Challenge Cup

Regular season

Play-offs

League standings

Player Statistics

As of Round 6  (6 March 2020)

2020 squad

2020 transfers 

Gains

Losses

References

External links 
 

Hull F.C. seasons
2020 in English rugby league
Super League XXV by club